The 1983 Sam Houston State Bearkats football team represented Sam Houston State University as a member of the Lone Star Conference (LSC) during the 1983 NCAA Division II football season. Led by second-year head coach Ron Randleman, the Bearkats compiled an overall record of 4–7 with a mark of 1–6 in conference play, and finished tied for seventh in the LSC.

Schedule

References

Sam Houston State
Sam Houston Bearkats football seasons
Sam Houston State Bearkats football